Ronald Crook (28 January 1907 – 17 January 1943) was a New Zealand cricketer. He played in nine first-class matches for Wellington from 1930 to 1934.

See also
 List of Wellington representative cricketers

References

External links
 

1907 births
1943 deaths
New Zealand cricketers
Wellington cricketers
Cricketers from Wellington City
New Zealand military personnel killed in World War II